MTV: The First 1000 Years: Hip Hop is a compilation album of hip hop songs, released by Rhino Entertainment on November 2, 1999.

Track listing

References

Hip hop compilation albums
1999 albums